This is a list of known wars, conflicts, battles/sieges, missions and operations involving ancient Greek city states and kingdoms, Magna Graecia, other Greek colonies (First Greek colonisation, Second Greek colonisation, Greeks in pre-Roman Crimea, Greeks in pre-Roman Gaul, Greeks in Egypt, Greeks in Syria, Greeks in Malta), Greek Kingdoms of Hellenistic period, Indo-Greek Kingdom, Greco-Bactrian Kingdom, Byzantine Empire/ Byzantine Greeks, Byzantine Greek successor states of the Byzantine Empire, Kingdom of Greece and Greece between 3000 BC and the present day.

Bronze Age, Aegean civilizations

Mycenaean Period

Ancient Greece

Dark Ages

Archaic Period

Classical Period

5th century BC

4th century BC

Hellenistic Period, Roman Period, Indo-Greek Kingdom and Greco-Bactrian Kingdom 

( * ) The Greek Kingdom of Pergamon helped the Roman Republic.

Medieval Greece

Byzantine Period,  Byzantine Greek successor states of the Byzantine Empire (Empire of Trebizond, Despotate of Epirus, Despotate of the Morea, Empire of Nicaea, Empire of Thessalonica, Principality of Theodoro) and Frankokratia 
(Frankokratia was after 1204, when Crusader states were established on the territory of the dissolved Byzantine Empire)

In 330 the Emperor Constantine the Great changed the capital of the Roman Empire from Rome to Constantinople. Greek population was part of the Empire and the Eastern part of the Roman Empire was already heavily Hellenized and Emperor Heraclius completed the Hellenization (replaced Latin with Greek as the official language, etc.) of the Byzantine Empire.

330–619

620–1204 

In 620, the Heraclius introduced Greek as the official language of the Empire. He also, adopted the Greek title of Basileus instead of the Latin Caesar, Augustus, or Imperator.

1205–1460

Modern Era

Ottoman Greece

1461–1799 

( * ) Greeks helped the Christian armies. 
( ** ) Greeks helped the Russian army.

In 1460 the Ottomans conquered the Despotate of the Morea, in 1461 the Empire of Trebizond (the Akcakale castle captured by the Turks in 1467 though), in 1475 the Principality of Theodoro, in 1479 the Despotate of Epirus and by 1500 most of the plains and islands were in Ottoman hands. Holdouts included Rhodes, conquered in 1522, Cyprus in 1571, Crete, retained by the Venetians until 1669, and the Ionian islands which remained primarily under the rule of the Republic of Venice.

19th century

1800–1832

1833–1899

( * ) Greeks helped the Russian army.

20th century

1900–1938 

( * ) Greece officially entered World War I in 1917.

1939–1945 

(  * ) Greece entered the World War II at 1940.

1946–1949 

There were fights between Greeks before 1946, but these were the prelude and not officially the start of the civil war

1950–1989 

( * ) Greece didn't participate at the battles and didn't declare war on Turkey, only some Greek units participated (mostly ELDYK).

1990–1999 

( * ) If the Greek force had/have a specific name.

The Greek forces had/have mostly peacekeeping, humanitarian, logistics, reconstruction and support role

21st century 

( * ) If the Greek force had/have a specific name. 
( ** ) Operations started in the 20th century but continuing into the 21st century are listed in both centuries. 
( *** ) ISAF was in Afghanistan from 2001–2014, but ELDAF-TESAF was from 2002-2012. Some trainers of the Hellenic Air Force who are training Afghanese pilots stayed there longer than the ELDAF-TESAF. RSM was in Afghanistan from 2015-2021.
( **** ) The Greek Forces in Afghanistan was named ELDAF until 2005 and later they renamed to TESAF. 
( ***** ) The Maritime Task Force (MTF) is the naval component of the United Nations Interim Force in Lebanon (UNIFIL)

The Greek forces had/have mostly peacekeeping, humanitarian, logistics, reconstruction and support role.

Wars involving Greece
Greece
Wars
Military history of Greece
Wars